Mockery is an American short silent film directed by Laurence Trimble for Vitagraph. The movie was released on June 5, 1912, being
Marshall P. Wilder's first appearance in a dramatic role.

Cast
Marshall P. Wilder Pepito, a Clown
Clara Kimball Young Princess Dolorosa
Ralph Ince Prince Dionio
James Young Lorenzo, the Court Physician

References

1912 films
American silent short films
American black-and-white films
Films directed by Laurence Trimble
1910s American films